Uliana Alexandrovna of Tver (– 17 March 1391) was a daughter of Prince Alexander of Tver and Anastasia of Halych (daughter of Yuri I of Galicia). She was the second wife of Algirdas, Grand Duke of Lithuania.

Life
After her father and eldest brother were murdered by Öz Beg Khan in 1339, Uliana was placed in care of Simeon of Moscow, who married Uliana's elder sister Maria in 1347.

In 1349, Algirdas, Grand Duke of Lithuania, sent an embassy to the Golden Horde, proposing to khan Jani Beg to form an alliance against Prince Simeon of Moscow; this proposal was not accepted and the envoys, including Algirdas' brother Karijotas, were imprisoned and held for ransom. In 1350, Algirdas then concluded peace with Simeon and married Simeon's sister-in-law Uliana. Simeon first asked an opinion of Metropolitan Theognostus whether a Christian lady could be married off to a pagan ruler. The same year, Algirdas' brother Liubartas married Olga, daughter of Konstantin Vasilyevich of Rostov and niece of Simeon.

According to research of Polish historian Jan Tęgowski, Uliana and Algirdas had eight sons and eight daughters (though other sources provide different data). It seems that the children, unlike children from Algirdas' first marriage with Maria of Vitebsk, were brought up in pagan culture. Uliana's son Jogaila (and not Algirdas' eldest son Andrei of Polotsk) inherited the throne and became Grand Duke of Lithuania in 1377. Uliana, as dowager grand duchess, appeared in national politics and was involved in the Lithuanian Civil War (1381–84) as well as an unsuccessful attempt to wed Jogaila with Sophia, daughter of Dmitri Donskoi, and convert him to Eastern Orthodoxy. The plans failed when Jogaila converted to Roman Catholicism, married Jadwiga of Poland, and was crowned King of Poland (jure uxoris) in 1386.

Death and burial
There are conflicting claims about Uliana's last years and her burial place. One account claims that Uliana became a nun under the name Marina in the Monastery of the Holy Spirit in Vitebsk and was buried there. Another claim, based on a silver plaque discovered during an 1810 construction, has it that she was buried in the Cathedral of the Theotokos in Vilnius. The Nikon Chronicle recorded that she was an nun at the Kiev Pechersk Lavra and was buried there. The newest discovery was made during a restoration of the Transfiguration Church in Polotsk in March 2012. An inscription was found that recorded Yulianiya's death on the feast of Saint Alexius, which is March 17 in Eastern Orthodoxy. On December 5, 2018, Yulianiya of Tver was canonized by the Ukrainian Autocephalous Orthodox Church.

See also
 Family of Algirdas – family of Uliana and Algirdas

References

Russian princesses
Rurikids
Grand Duchesses of Lithuania
Russian nuns
1320s births
1391 deaths
Year of birth uncertain

14th-century Russian people
14th-century Russian women